Kinkdom is a studio album by the English rock band the Kinks, released as their fourth album in the United States. It peaked at number 47 on the Billboard album chart.

The album had no direct analogue outside of the US market, but instead collected songs from the Kwyet Kinks UK EP, both sides of the "See My Friends" single, the B-sides of several of the band's singles, a track left off of the US edition of the 1965 album Kinda Kinks and a previously released track. All of its songs were recorded at Pye and IBC Studios in London, between July1964 and August1965. Kinkdom was the last US-only studio album released by the Kinks; beginning with The Kink Kontroversy in March1966, Reprise issued albums identical to the UK versions.

Track listing
All songs by Ray Davies, except as noted.

Side one
 "A Well Respected Man"2:43
 "Such a Shame"2:19
 "Wait Till the Summer Comes Along" (Dave Davies)2:07
 "Naggin' Woman" (Lazy Lester)2:36
 "Never Met a Girl Like You Before"2:05
 "See My Friends"2:46

Side two
 "Who'll Be the Next in Line"2:02
 "Don't You Fret"2:45
 "I Need You"2:26
 "It's Alright"2:37
 "Louie Louie" (Richard Berry)2:57

Personnel 
According to band biographer Doug Hinman:

The Kinks
Ray Davieslead vocals, rhythm guitar; harmonica ; piano ; acoustic twelve-string guitar 
Dave Daviesbacking vocals, lead guitar; doubled rhythm guitar ; lead vocal 
Pete Quaifebacking vocals, bass guitar
Mick Avorydrums; tambourine 

Additional musicians
Rasa Daviesbacking vocals 
Perry Fordpiano 
Bobby Grahamdrums 
Arthur Greensladepiano 

Production
Bob Augerengineering
Alan MacKenzieengineering
Shel Talmyproducer

Charts

References

Sources

External links
The Official Ray Davies Web Site

The Kinks compilation albums
1965 compilation albums
Albums produced by Shel Talmy
Reprise Records compilation albums